The 1958 Missouri Tigers baseball team represented the University of Missouri in the 1958 NCAA University Division baseball season. The Tigers played their home games at Rollins Field. The team was coached by Hi Simmons in his 20th season at Missouri.

Led by All-Americans Sonny Siebert, Bo Toft and Ray Uriarte, the Tigers advanced to the 1958 College World Series, where they lost to Southern California in the championship game.

Roster

Schedule

Awards and honors
Ernie Nevers
First Team All Big Eight

Sonny Siebert
Third Team All-American
All District V
First Team All Big Eight

Bo Toft
Second Team All-American 
All District V
First Team All Big Eight

Ray Uriarte
First Team All-American 
All District V
First Team All Big Eight

References

Missouri Tigers
Missouri Tigers baseball seasons
Big Eight Conference baseball champion seasons
College World Series seasons